Huru may refer to:

Hiurud, an Iranian village also known as Hūrū
Chronicle of Huru, forged 19th century text about Romanian history in Moldavia
Mbira huru, African wood and metal key instrument, similar to a marimba
Dickson Huru (born 1990), Ugandan cross country runner
Izaak Huru Doko (1913-1985), Indonesian politician and National Hero of Indonesia
Petri Huru, Finnish politician

See also
Hurus (disambiguation)